Oroshori (also known as Roshorvi) is a dialect of Shughni, a Pamiri language spoken in the Gorno-Badakhshan Autonomous Region in Tajikistan as well as 267 speakers in Afghanistan's Badakhshan Province.  It is similar to other dialects of Shughni such as Rushani and Bartangi.  Oroshori contains many loanwords from Sarikoli as well as Kyrgyz.

References 

Eastern Iranian languages
Badakhshan Province
Gorno-Badakhshan Autonomous Region